Vladimir Yakovlevich Begun (1929 - 1989) was one of the leading official Zionologists in the Soviet Union; senior fellow in Institute for Philosophy and Law of Belarusian Academy of Sciences; state communist propagandist and member of the Union of Journalists of the USSR.

One of his controversial books, The Encroaching Counter Revolution, caused some controversy. In November 1975, the leading Soviet historian, academician M. Korostovtsev criticized it: "...it perceptibly stirs up anti-Semitism under the flag of anti-Zionism." According to Wolf Rubinchyk, Minsk-based researcher, Begun's notorious book "The Invasion without Arms" was used not only by official propagandists, but also by some members of counter-elite, young Belarusian nationalists, who were suspicious about Zionism. Rubinchyk also pointed to falsifications of Simon Dubnow's ideas by Begun.

Begun won a certain position in the Soviet hierarchy and was transferred from provincial Minsk to Moscow. Until his death, he staunchly opposed bringing Marc Chagall's exhibition to Belarus, the famous artist's place of birth, on "anti-Zionist" grounds.

External links

Notes

1929 births
1989 deaths
Belarusian academics
Members of the USSR Academy of Sciences